AJB or A. J. B. may refer to:

Business and Organizations 
 Aero JBR (ICAO code AJB), a Mexican airline
 AJ Bell (LSE: AJB), a public limited company that provides online investment services
 Al Jazeera Balkans (AJB), an international news television service headquartered in Sarajevo, Bosnia
 Association of Jews in Belgium (AJB), former organization set up by the Germans to administer the Belgian Jewish population, 1941

People 
 A. J. B. Hope, one of the monikers of Alexander Beresford Hope (1820–1887)
 Archibald James Butterworth (1912–2005) inventor and racing motorist whod built the A.J.B. Special, a Formula One car.

Publications 
 American Journal of Botany, monthly peer-reviewed scientific journal
 American Journal of Business, biannual peer-reviewed academic journal
 The Amazing Jeckel Brothers, an album by Insane Clown Posse
 The Amazing Joy Buzzards, a comic book series